The sixth season of Dancing with the Stars premiered on 26 January 2018, airing on ANT1. The show is based on the United Kingdom BBC Television series Strictly Come Dancing and is part of BBC Worldwide's Dancing with the Stars franchise. The theme song is "It's personal" performed by Swedish indie pop band The Radio Dept.

The co-hosts for season six are season 4’s Evangelia Aravani and former season one host, Savvas Poumpouras. Alexis Kostalas and Galena Velikova were joined by Giorgos Liagas and former season 2 contestant, Eleonora Meleti on the judging panel

It was revealed that season six would have 16 contestants, the biggest number of participants so far. The professional partners were revealed on 17 January 2018. During week six, Olga Piliaki made her debut as a contestant and in week seven Maggie Charalampidou joined the competition.

In week 10, Meleti had her last appearance as a judge of the show, leaving the show due to her pregnancy.

In week 11, there was a change in the rules. The two couples with the lowest combined score from judges and viewers will get to dance again. Once they have danced the judges will vote for the couple they want to stay.

In week 12 and 13, the two couples with the lowest scores would be eliminated. The first couple would be the one on the bottom of the leader board and the second couple would be the one who lost the dance off.

In week 14, Kakouriotis and Mavridi were declared the winner. Valavani and Manogiannakis came in second place, with Olga & Giorgos came in third place third place.

Judges
Alexis Kostalas, announcer, sports commentator.
Galena Velikova, choreographer, dancer, dance teacher. Former judge on season 1,3 and 4 of the Bulgarian version of the show.
Eleonora Meleti, TV hostess. Former season 2 contestant.
Giorgos Liagas, TV host. Former season 4 guest judge.

Guest judges 

 Natalia Germanou – Week 6
 Vicky Hadjivassiliou – Week 7
 Maria Solomou – Week 8
 Tatiana Stefanidou – Week 9
 Katerina Gagaki – Week 10
 Nadia Boule – Week 11
 Ntoretta Papadimitriou – Week 12
 Isaias Matiamba – Week 13
 Charis Christopoulos – Week 14

Couples

 Since week 6
 Since week 7

Scoring chart

Red numbers indicate the lowest score for each week
Green numbers indicate the highest score for each week
 the couple got the lowest score of the night and was eliminated that week
 the couple eliminated that week
 the returning couple finishing in the bottom two
 this couple withdrew from the competition
 the winning couple
 the runner-up couple
 the third-place couple
 the couple didn't dance this week
 the couple won immunity from the previous live

Average score chart 
This table only counts for dances scored on a traditional 40-points scale.

Couples' highest and lowest scoring dances

According to the traditional 40-point scale:

According to the traditional 50-point scale:

Weekly scores
Individual judges scores in the charts below (given in parentheses) are listed in this order from left to right: Alexis Kostalas, Galena Velikova, Eleonora Meleti and Giorgos Liagas.

Week 1  

Running order

Week 2  

Running order

Week 3  

Running order

Week 4: Cinema night  
Running order

Week 5: Greek Night  

Running order

Week 6: Rock Night  
This week the show had Natalia Germanou as a guest judge and her score counted for the final result of this week's elimination. Also Velikova and Meleti switched seats so the judges score is in this order of Kostalas, Meleti, Velikova, Liagkas, Germanou. 
Running order

Week 7  
This week the show had Vicky Hadjivassiliou as a guest judge and her score counted for the final result of this week's elimination. Also Velikova and Meleti switched seats so the judges score is in this order of Kostalas, Meleti, Velikova, Liagkas, Hadjivassiliou. 
Running order

Week 8: Stand by me  
This week the show had Maria Solomou as a guest judge and her score counted for the final result of this week's elimination. Also Velikova and Meleti switched seats so the judges score is in this order (Kostalas, Meleti, Velikova, Liagkas, Solomou) 
Running order

Week 9: Team dances  
This week the show had Tatiana Stefanidou as a guest judge and her score counted for the final result of this week's elimination. Also Velikova and Meleti switched seats so the judges score is in this order of Kostalas, Meleti, Velikova, Liagkas, Stefanidou. 
Running order

Week 10: Cha-Cha-Challenge  
This week the show had Katerina Gagaki as a guest judge and her score counted for the final result of this week's elimination. Also Velikova and Meleti switched seats so the judges score is in this order of Kostalas, Meleti, Velikova, Liagkas, Gagaki. Also, there was no elimination this week and the couple with the highest combined score from judges and viewers got immunity and was safe for next week.
Running order

Week 11: Latin Marathon  
This week the show had Nadia Boule as a guest judge and her score counted for the final result of this week's elimination. The judges score are in the order of Kostalas, Boule, Velikova, Liagkas. This week contestants (except Evridiki & Paulos who had immunity) competed in a Latin Marathon. The winning couple were rewarded four extra points. In the dance off, Maria & Elias lost the judges vote 2:1 and were eliminated.

Running order

Week 12: Solo Night/Hot Battle  
This week the show had Season 3 winner, Ntoretta Papadimitriou as a guest judge and her score counted for the final result of this week's elimination. The judges score are in the order of Kostalas, Velikova, Liagkas, Papadimitriou. During their routines contestants had to dance solo for 30 seconds during their routine. Later in the show contestants split into two teams: Men vs Women. The winning team were rewarded two extra points. In the dance off, Anthimos & Tzeni lost the judges vote 3:0 and were eliminated.

Running order

Week 13: Semi-finals 
This week the show had season 4 winner, Isaias Matiamba as a guest judge and his score counted for the final result of this week's elimination. The judges score are in the order of Kostalas, Velikova, Liagkas, Matiamba. This week, contestants were required to dance twice. The first was chosen by the production and the second by the contestants. In the dance off, Myriella & Tasos lost the judges vote 2:1 and were eliminated.

Running order

Week 14: Finals  
This week the show had Charis Christopoulos as a guest judge. The judges score are in the order of Kostalas, Velikova, Liagkas, Christopoulos.

Running order

Guest stars

References

External links
 Official website of Dancing with the Stars Greece

Season 06
2018 Greek television seasons